Korechika (written: 惟幾 or 伊周) is a masculine Japanese given name. Notable people with the name include:

, Japanese general
, Japanese kugyō

Japanese masculine given names